Poecilasthena is a genus of moths in the family Geometridae.

Species
unnamed group
 Poecilasthena aedaea Turner, 1926
 Poecilasthena balioloma (Turner, 1907)
 Poecilasthena burmensis Prout, 1926
 Poecilasthena character Prout, 1932
 Poecilasthena cisseres Turner, 1933
 Poecilasthena dimorpha Holloway, 1979
 Poecilasthena euphylla (Meyrick, 1891)
 Poecilasthena fragilis Turner, 1942
 Poecilasthena glaucosa (Lucas, 1888)
 Poecilasthena inhaesa Prout, 1934
 Poecilasthena iopolia (Turner, 1926)
 Poecilasthena ischnophrica Turner, 1941
 Poecilasthena leucydra Prout, 1934
 Poecilasthena limnaea Prout, 1926
 Poecilasthena nubivaga Prout, 1932
 Poecilasthena oceanias (Meyrick, 1891)
 Poecilasthena panapala Turner, 1922
 Poecilasthena paucilinea Warren, 1906
 Poecilasthena phaeodryas Turner, 1931
 Poecilasthena pisicolor Turner, 1942
 Poecilasthena prouti West, 1929
 Poecilasthena pulchraria (Doubleday, 1843)
 Poecilasthena scoliota (Meyrick, 1891)
 Poecilasthena sthenommata Turner, 1922
 Poecilasthena subpurpureata (Walker, 1863)
 Poecilasthena thalassias (Meyrick, 1891)
 Poecilasthena urarcha (Meyrick, 1891)
papuensis group
 Poecilasthena euthecta (Turner, 1904) (alternatively listed under Minoa)
 Poecilasthena papuensis (Warren, 1906)
anthodes group
 Poecilasthena anthodes (Meyrick, 1891)
 Poecilasthena schistaria (Walker, 1861)
 Poecilasthena xylocyma (Meyrick, 1891)

References

External links
Natural History Museum Lepidoptera genus database

 
Asthenini
Geometridae genera